Corey McIntyre (born January 25, 1979) is a former American football fullback. He was signed by the Philadelphia Eagles as an undrafted free agent in 2002. He played college football at West Virginia. McIntyre has also played for the Cleveland Browns, New Orleans Saints, Atlanta Falcons, and the Buffalo Bills

Early years 
McIntyre attended Indiantown Middle School and South Fork High School.

College career 
McIntyre played in 44 games at West Virginia, primarily as a defensive end and linebacker. He rushed three times for four yards as a fullback, and returned five kickoffs for 36 yards.

Professional career

Philadelphia Eagles 
McIntyre was signed by the Philadelphia Eagles as an undrafted free agent on April 26, 2002. He was waived by the Eagles on August 24, 2002. McIntyre was re-signed to the Eagles' practice squad on December 10, 2002, and allocated to the Frankfurt Galaxy to participate in the 2003 NFL Europa season on January 30, 2003. In Europe, he helped his team make it to the World Bowl and, in that game, had 12 carries for 76 yards. He was waived by the Eagles on September 1, 2003.

Cleveland Browns 
McIntyre was signed by the Cleveland Browns as a free agent on June 16, 2004. He was waived by the Browns on September 5, 2004, and signed to the team's practice squad on September 6, 2004. He played in fifteen games for the Browns during the 2005 season and started one.

New Orleans Saints 
The New Orleans Saints signed McIntyre in September 2006 after injuries to two of their fullbacks in the first week of play. He was waived in November.

Atlanta Falcons 
McIntyre was claimed off waivers by the Atlanta Falcons on November 24, 2006. During the 2007 season he was voted as special teams captain and was third on special teams for tackles. He was released from the Falcons on September 2, 2008.

Buffalo Bills 
McIntyre was signed by the Buffalo Bills on September 30, 2008, after the team released fullback Darian Barnes. McIntyre was re-signed to a two-year contract on February 26, 2009. The Bills again re-signed McIntyre to a two-year contract on September 6, 2010.

Personal life 
McIntyre is from Indiantown, Florida, has 4 children, and attended school in West Virginia.

References

External links 

Buffalo Bills bio
'Eers in Pros Profile

Living people
1979 births
People from Stuart, Florida
Players of American football from Florida
American football defensive ends
American football linebackers
American football fullbacks
West Virginia Mountaineers football players
Philadelphia Eagles players
Frankfurt Galaxy players
Cleveland Browns players
New Orleans Saints players
Atlanta Falcons players
Buffalo Bills players
West Virginia University alumni